In enzymology, an anthocyanin 5-aromatic acyltransferase is an enzyme that catalyzes the chemical reaction

hydroxycinnamoyl-CoA + anthocyanidin-3,5-diglucoside  CoA + anthocyanidin 3-glucoside-5-hydroxycinnamoylglucoside

Thus, the two substrates of this enzyme are hydroxycinnamoyl-CoA and anthocyanidin-3,5-diglucoside, whereas its two products are CoA and anthocyanidin 3-glucoside-5-hydroxycinnamoylglucoside.

This enzyme belongs to the family of transferases, specifically those acyltransferases transferring groups other than aminoacyl groups.  The systematic name of this enzyme class is hydroxycinnamoyl-CoA:anthocyanidin 3,5-diglucoside 5-O-glucoside-6"'-O-hydroxycinnamoyltransferase.

References 

 

EC 2.3.1
Enzymes of unknown structure
Anthocyanins metabolism